Melaleuca sophisma is a plant in the myrtle family, Myrtaceae, and is endemic to the south-west of Western Australia. It is superficially similar to Melaleuca cliffortioides but differs from it in the arrangement of the flowers and in details of the leaves. The flowers are white, fading to cream and are arranged in small heads on the sides of the branches.

Description
Its branchlets are glabrous (unlike those of Melaleuca cliffortioides).

The flowers are white, fading to pink, and are arranged in heads   in diameter in the axils of the leaves, each head with 3 to 5 groups of flowers in threes. (M. cliffortioides has single flowers in its leaf axils.) The stamens are arranged in five bundles around the flower, each bundle containing 12 to 15 stamens.

Taxonomy and naming
Melaleuca sophisma was first formally described as a new species in 2000 by Brendan J. Lepschi. The specific epithet (sophisma) is a Greek word meaning "false conclusion" or "fallacy", referring to the misidentification of this plant in this species as Melaleuca cliffortioides.

Distribution and habitat
Melaleuca sophisma has a restricted distribution in the Kundip district in the Esperance Plains biogeographic region. It grows in mallee and shrubland in sandy loam and clay loam.

Conservation
Melaleuca sophisma is listed as "Priority One" by the Government of Western Australia Department of Parks and Wildlife meaning that it is known from one or a few locations (generally five or less) which are potentially at risk.

References

sophisma
Myrtales of Australia
Plants described in 2000
Endemic flora of Western Australia